The Art of Return is a 2020 Spanish drama film directed by Pedro Collantes. It stars Macarena García alongside Nacho Sánchez, Ingrid García Jonsson, Mireia Oriol, Luka Peros, Lucía Juárez and Celso Bugallo.

Plot 
The plot tracks a young actress (Noemí) returning from New York to Spain to attend a potentially career-changing audition. Once in Madrid, she rethinks vital issues.

Cast

Production 
The film was developed under the Venice's Biennale College film workshop programme. Pedro Collantes was credited as film editor of his debut film, which was produced by Tourmalet Films.  took over the cinematography whereas  was responsible for the music.

Release 
The Art of Return was presented at the 77th Venice International Film Festival on 8 September 2020. It also screened at the Seville European Film Festival, the Hong Kong International Film Festival and the Transilvania International Film Festival. Distributed by Filmax, it was theatrically released in Spain on 11 December 2020.

Reception 
Miguel Ángel Pizarro of eCartelera ranked the film number 3 on the top ten Spanish films of 2020, considering that Macarena García offers one of the best performances of her career, and that the film is one of those hidden gems, to be delighted with because it is a discovery, a small miracle, one of those that leave a long aftertaste in the viewer.

Carlos Marañón of Cinemanía rated the film 3½ out of 5 stars, considering that even if the film goes round and round around the same idea, that circumstance, rather than a drawback, it reinforces the film's identity.

Mariona Borrull of Fotogramas rated the film 3 out of 5 stars, highlighting Macarena García's acting "muscle" as the best thing about the film while mentioning that the films "sometimes lacks a bit of punch" as the worst thing about it.

Sergi Sánchez of La Razón rated it 3 out of 5 stars, highlighting García's performance playing a character with whom it is not easy to empathize ("so Rohmerian in her self-deceptions and egoisms") as the best thing about the film, while citing the not-very-credible escene in the art gallery with García Jonsson as a negative point.

Accolades 

|-
| rowspan = "2" align = "center" | 2021 || 76th CEC Medals || Best New Director || Pedro Collantes ||  || align = "center" | 
|-
| 8th Feroz Awards || Best Film Poster || Pablo Dávila, Espinar Gabriel ||  || align = "center" | 
|}

See also 
 List of Spanish films of 2020

References

External links 
 The Art of Return on IMDb
 The Art of Return on ICAA's Catálogo de Cinespañol
 Official trailer on YouTube

Films set in Madrid
2020 drama films
2020s Spanish-language films
2020s Spanish films
Spanish drama films
Films about actors